Michael William Lang, known as Mike Lang (born August 29, 1962), is an American politician from Granbury in Hood County, Texas. He was the Republican state representative for District 60. He won the general election on November 8, 2016, and was sworn into office on January 10, 2017.

Lang ran without opposition for his second legislative term in the general election held on November 6, 2018.

References

External links
 Campaign website
 State legislative page
 Mike Lang at the Texas Tribune

1962 births
Living people
Republican Party members of the Texas House of Representatives
21st-century American politicians
People from Granbury, Texas
Politicians from Fort Worth, Texas